Three different organisations sent questionnaires to the parties competing in the 2008 legislative elections in Austria, seeking answers to various policy questions; the questions and answers are set out in this article.

Wahlkabine

The internet platform wahlkabine.at (Wahlkabine means "voting booth"), which has offered a decision support for state elections, national elections and European Parliament elections in Austria since 2002, sent a questionnaire consisting of twenty-six questions on political positions to the SPÖ, the ÖVP, the Greens, the FPÖ, the BZÖ, the LIF, the FRITZ and the KPÖ; all parties except for the FRITZ replied with their answers (shown in the following table).

Politikkabine

The internet platform politikkabine.at (Politikkabine means "politics booth") offered a similar questionnaire of twenty-six questions, to which nine of the lists contesting the election nationwide (all parties except Save Austria) replied.

Wiener Zeitung

The Wiener Zeitung had a similar service called Wahlmaschine ("election machine"); all parties replied with their answers to the thirty questions.

References

Elections in Austria
2008 elections in Austria